Xenocharax is a genus of freshwater fish in the family Distichodontidae found in the Congo River Basin in Middle Africa.

Species
There are currently 2 recognized species in this genus:

 Xenocharax crassus Pellegrin, 1900
 Xenocharax spilurus Günther, 1867

References

Distichodontidae
Fish of Africa
Ray-finned fish genera
Freshwater fish genera
Taxa named by Albert Günther